John Rule Beasley (born October 10, 1960), better known as John Beasley, is a jazz pianist, bandleader, and producer of music for film and television.

Career
He was born in Shreveport, Louisiana, and grew up in Texas in a family of musicians.

His grandfather, Rule Oliver, trombonist, for 50 years was a junior high school band director in Arkansas; his father, Rule Curtis Beasley, music educator, in 1963 won 1st prize in Composition at the Southeastern Composers League in Tuscaloosa, Alabama; his mother, Lida Beasley, brass instrumentalist, was a band director, conducted operas and taught music in various public schools and colleges.

He approached music at the age of eight by studying piano, but in his teens he played guitar, drums, saxophone, trumpet and oboe.

Returning to piano and jazz, at the age of twenty he performed his first major concert at Carnegie Hall with Hubert Laws, John Patitucci and the drummer Joey Heredia.

During the 1970s, he performed jazz and R&B in Los Angeles. He toured with Sergio Mendes, then worked as a studio musician. For several years he was a member of band led by Freddie Hubbard. In 1992 his debut album Cauldron, produced by Walter Becker, was released by Windham Hill.

Discography (partial)

Soloist 
 1992 - Cauldron (Windham Hill, 01934 10134-2)
 1993 - A Change of Heart (Windham Hill, 01934 10145 2)
 2001 - Surfacing (EWE Records, EWCD 2002)
2005 - One Live Night (John Beasley, 17528–56)
 2008 - Letter to Herbie (Resonance, RCD-1003)
 2009 - Positootly! (Resonance, RCD-1013)
 2016 - John Beasley Presents MONK'estra Vol. 1 (Mack Avenue, MAC1113)
 2017 - John Beasley Presents MONK'estra Vol. 2 (Mack Avenue, MAC1125)
 2020 - MONK'estra Plays John Beasley (Mack Avenue, MAC1172)

Soundtracks 

 1993 - Mose the Fireman, with Walter Becker and Michael Keaton (Rabbit Ears Productions, 74041-70748-2)

Collaborations 

 2013 - Gianfranco Continenza, Dusting the Time (Videoradio, VRCD 000844)

Music director, TV shows 

 2005 - American Idol (multi-platinum Carrie Underwood victory in 2005 as associate music director), FOX
 2005 - Carly Simon A Moonlight Serenade aboard Queen Mary, PBS 
 2007 - Search for the Next Pussycat Dolls, CW
 2012 - Duets with John Legend, Kelly Clarkson, Robin Thicke, Jennifer Nettles, ABC
 2014 - Sports Illustrated Swimsuit: 50 Years of Beautiful, NBC
 2014 - Sing Your Face Off, ABC
 2015 - 2016 - American Idol, FOX
 2016 - Jazz at the White House (Emmy nomination for best music direction), ABC
 2017 - International Jazz Day in Cuba, BET

Awards

John Beasley has been nominated for 8 Grammy Awards and won 1.

Pianist John Beasley won the 2021 Best Arrangement, Instrumental Or A Cappella Grammy Award on March 14, 2021, for his arrangement of Donna Lee performed by his big band, MONK'estra, from the album MONK'estra Plays John Beasley, on Mack Avenue Records. He was nominated for a total of four Grammy Awards in 2021.

63RD ANNUAL GRAMMY AWARDS (2020)
Winer: BEST ARRANGEMENT, INSTRUMENTAL OR A CAPPELLA - Donna Lee

Nominations
BEST JAZZ VOCAL ALBUM
Holy Room: Live At Alte Oper
BEST LARGE JAZZ ENSEMBLE ALBUM
MONK'estra Plays John Beasley
BEST ARRANGEMENT, INSTRUMENTS AND VOCALS
Asas Fechadas

Grammys 2021: Jazzman John Beasley on his four nominations

John Beasley Presents Monk'estra volumes 1 and 2 both garnered two Grammy nominations each at the 59th and 60th Grammy Awards in 2017 and 2018.

60TH ANNUAL GRAMMY AWARDS (2017)
Nominations
BEST LARGE JAZZ ENSEMBLE ALBUM
MONK'estra Vol. 2
BEST ARRANGEMENT, INSTRUMENTAL OR A CAPPELLA
Ugly Beauty/Pannonica

59TH ANNUAL GRAMMY AWARDS (2016)
Nominations
BEST LARGE JAZZ ENSEMBLE ALBUM
MONK'estra, Vol. 1
BEST ARRANGEMENT, INSTRUMENTAL OR A CAPPELLA
Ask Me Now

53rd ANNUAL GRAMMY AWARDS (2010)
Positootly earned a 2011 Grammy nomination for BEST JAZZ INSTRUMENTAL RECORDING.

References

External links
Official website
John Beasley, on Discogs

1960 births
Living people
American jazz composers
American male jazz composers
American jazz pianists
American male pianists
Grammy Award winners
Miles Davis
Musicians from Shreveport, Louisiana
20th-century American pianists
Jazz musicians from Louisiana
Mack Avenue Records artists
Windham Hill Records artists
Resonance Records artists
African-American pianists